Dvorište Vivodinsko is a village near Ozalj, Karlovac County, Croatia.

Location 
It is situated 23 km from Karlovac and 8 km northwest of Ozalj.

Historical population

References 

Populated places in Karlovac County